Miss Korea is a South Korean television series starring Lee Sun-kyun, Lee Yeon-hee, Lee Mi-sook, Lee Sung-min, Song Seon-mi, and Lee Ki-woo. It aired on MBC from December 18, 2013, to February 26, 2014, on Wednesdays and Thursdays at 21:55 for 20 episodes.

Plot 
Set in the year 1997, a cosmetics company is in bad financial shape during the IMF crisis, so to save the company, Hyung-joon along with his fellow employees attempt to make 25-year-old Ji-young into Miss Korea, a nationwide beauty pageant winner. Back in their high school days, Ji-young was the most beautiful and popular girl on campus, but she now works as an elevator girl.

Cast

Main
Lee Yeon-hee as Oh Ji-young
25 years old, "Dream" department store elevator girl. She was Kim Hyung-joon's junior in high-school and his first love.
Lee Sun-kyun as Kim Hyung-joon
29 years old, president of ViVi cosmetics, who has huge debt to loan sharks (for his cosmetics factory) and additionally needs money for launch new developed product of his company - BB cream.
Lee Mi-sook as Ma Ae-ri
54 years old, ex-Miss Korea, owner of Queen Beauty Salon, coach of future Miss Korea.
Lee Sung-min as Jung Seon-saeng
39 years old, gangster working for loan shark. He is assigned to Kim Hyung-joon to ensure collecting debt from him. His given name (Seon-saeng) means teacher in Korean. Because of that, his full name sounds like family name with title (teacher Jung).
Song Seon-mi as Go Hwa-jung
31 years old, chief researcher of ViVi cosmetics.
Lee Ki-woo as Lee Yoon
29 years old, investment agent of M&A company Human Partners Korea. He was Kim Hyung-joon's classmate in high-school.

Supporting

Queen Beauty Salon
Ko Sung-hee as Kim Jae-hee, Miss Korea candidate, coached by Queen Beauty Salon. Daughter of congressman Kim Sung-chul. 
Heo Seung-jae as Yoon Sil-jang, Ma Ae-ri's assistant
Park Guk-sun as Choi Soo-yeon, Miss Korea candidate, coached by Queen Beauty Salon.
Kang Tae-oh as Ma Ae-ri's son

Cherry Beauty Salon
Hong Ji-min as Yang Choon-ja, owner of Cherry Beauty Salon. Ma Ae-ri's ex-assistant who become her rival.
Kang Han-na as Im Seon-joo, Miss Korea candidate, coached by Cherry Beauty Salon.
Ha Yeon-joo as Shin Sun-young, Miss Korea candidate, coached by Cherry Beauty Salon.

ViVi Cosmetics
Oh Jung-se as Kim Heung-sam, planning director of ViVi cosmetics
Choi Jae-hwan as Kim Kang-woo, researcher of ViVi cosmetics
Jo Sang-ki as Kim Kang-shik, director of BaDa cosmetics, Kim Kang-woo's older brother

Oh Ji-young's family
Jang Yong as Oh Jong-goo, Oh Ji-young's grandfather
Jung Kyu-soo as Oh Myun-sang, Oh Ji-young's father
Jung Suk-yong as Oh Woong-sang, Oh Ji-young's uncle
Baek Bong-ki as Oh Ji-seok, Oh Ji-young's brother

"Dream" department store
Jang Won-young as Department head Park
Yoo Eun-ho as Jung Eun-ah, "Dream" department store elevator girl
Kim Ye-won as Lee Young-sun, "Dream" department store elevator girl
Park Ha-na as Han So-jin, "Dream" department store elevator girl
Moon Ji-in as Kim Yoo-ra, "Dream" department store elevator girl

Others
Go In-beom as congressman Kim Sung-chul, Kim Jae-hee's father
Im Ye-jin as Go Bong-hee, Kim Hyung-joon's mother
Jung Seung-kil as President Hwang, loan shark
Oh Min-ae as Director Choi	
Jung So-min as gas station attendant whom Ma Ae-ri targets to become Miss Korea 1998 (cameo, ep 20)

Ratings
In the table below, the blue numbers represent the lowest ratings and the red numbers represent the highest ratings.

Original soundtrack

Awards and nominations

International broadcast
 It aired in Japan on cable channel KNTV beginning July 12, 2014.
 It aired in Thailand on PPTV beginning April 16, 2015, dubbed as Kerd Ma Pen Dao. ("เกิดมาเป็นดาว", literally: Born to be a Star).
 It aired in Vietnam on VTV3 beginning January 5, 2015, Hoa hậu Hàn Quốc.
It aired in China on PPTV and Sohu video，韩国小姐.

See also
 Miss Korea
 Monochrome (Lee Hyori album)

References

External links
 Miss Korea official MBC website 
 Miss Korea at MBC Global Media
 
 

2013 South Korean television series debuts
2014 South Korean television series endings
MBC TV television dramas
Television series by SM C&C
South Korean comedy-drama television series
Television shows written by Seo Sook-hyang
Department stores in fiction
Television series set in shops